Old Mac is a 1961 film directed by Michael Winner.

External links

1961 films
1961 drama films
American drama films
1960s English-language films
1960s American films